In Keeping Secrets of Silent Earth: 3 is a song by the American progressive rock band Coheed and Cambria. The song was released as the third and final single from the album of the same name. The song did not chart and no music video was ever produced. The song is a staple of their live shows and one of the most popular cult hits from their discography.

Story
The song tells of the first exchange between Jesse, the leader of the resistance, and Mayo, general for The Red Army.

Reception
A reviewer for AbsolutePunk said the song "[instills] euphoria in the listener." Mind Equals Blown reviewer Jason Gardner, in a retrospective review of the album, called the song "huge" and "emotional."

Track listing

Band
Claudio Sanchez – lead vocals, rhythm guitar
Travis Stever – lead guitar, backing vocals
Michael Todd – bass guitar, screamed vocals
Josh Eppard – drums, percussion, piano

References

Coheed and Cambria songs
The Amory Wars
Columbia Records singles
2004 singles
2003 songs
Songs written by Claudio Sanchez